Chen Mei-ling (born 1958) is a Taiwanese politician. She was the Minister of National Development Council in 2017–2020 and the Secretary-General of the Executive Yuan in 2016-2017.

Early life
Chen obtained her bachelor's degree in law from National Chengchi University (NCCU) in 1980, master's degree in law from National Taiwan University in 1984 and returned to NCCU for a doctoral degree in law in 1995.

Political career
Chen was deputy secretary general of the Executive Yuan from 2006 to 2008. She returned to the cabinet in 2016 as secretary-general under premier Lin Chuan. Chen became minister of the National Development Council in September 2017, and was later awarded an Order of Brilliant Star. She resigned from the National Development Council on 14 May 2020.

References 

1958 births
Living people
Women government ministers of Taiwan
Government ministers of Taiwan
National Taiwan University alumni
National Chengchi University alumni
Recipients of the Order of Brilliant Star